Mallory Hurwitz Lewis (née Tarcher; born July 8, 1962) is an American writer, television producer, ventriloquist, and puppeteer. She currently puppeteers Lamb Chop (a sock puppet created by her mother, Shari Lewis).

Early life
Mallory Lewis was born as Mallory Tarcher in New York City into a Jewish family. She is the daughter of Jeremy Tarcher (1932–2015) and Shari Lewis (1933–1998), creator of Lamb Chop. Growing up, Lewis used to sleep with Lamb Chop. She is of Jewish faith.

Career
Lewis worked closely with her mother as producer of Lamb Chop's Play-Along and The Charlie Horse Music Pizza. Jeremy Tarcher had also been part of Shari Lewis's shows on PBS. After her mother's death in 1998, on the advice of family and family friend, the late Dom DeLuise, Tarcher decided that Lamb Chop should live on for her many fans.

In 2009, she started performing with Lamb Chop. During this time, she changed her surname to Lewis, as an homage to her mother. Although Lamb Chop may be described as "sassy", "please" and "thank you" are part of the repertoire. Lewis has the same hand size as her mother.

Lewis said of her decision to take up the puppet: "My mom was one of the world's greatest entertainers. I don't want to challenge that. I don't think it's wise to go there. But I do want to do everything that I can do for Lamb Chop. I'll help keep her going". Lewis had never attempted to imitate Lamb Chop's voice but upon receiving a posthumous award for Shari, Lewis performed with the puppet, discovering that she had her mother's ability to effect the voice without lip movement.

Lewis is also a writer of children's books, some of which star Zoey, a baby orangutan character she also puppeteers.

Lewis performs extensively for military support organizations such as the USO and the Fisher House Foundation, performing arts centers, and at state fairs around the country. In 2002, Lewis helped raise $275,000 for UCLA's Neuro-Oncology Program, as well as being a founder of Jump For The Cause, a women's world record skydiving organization that has raised nearly $2 million for Breast Cancer Research. Lewis is also on the board of the Blue Ribbon.

Lewis was the co-host of the 2014 AMG Heritage Awards with host Billy Gilman and David L Cook. During the broadcast, she accepted the Sandy Hosey Lifetime Achievement Award presented by the Artists Music Guild.

Prior to her death, Shari Lewis sold most of the rights pertaining to Lamb Chop to Golden Books Family Entertainment; a series of transactions resulted in these rights being held by Classic Media (now DreamWorks Classics, part of NBCUniversal), though Mallory still owns the live performing rights to Lamb Chop. Lewis wishes one day to put Lamb Chop back on television.

In the same way Lamb Chop was passed down from mother to daughter, the legacy of Lamb Chop has been passed on to Lewis' son, James Abraham Tarcher Hood. James usually travels with his mother as a road manager, working behind the scenes by setting up sound equipment and selling merchandise. And he is the only person aside from Shari and Mallory to have had his hand inside Lamb Chop. "She is so real in his life, as she was in mine," Lewis said.

Awards
Mallory Lewis has won an Emmy Award for Outstanding Writing in a Children's Series and has been nominated several times. She and her mother shared an Emmy Award.

Notes

References
 Mallory Lewis and Lamb Chop Retrieved 2010-05-22.

External links 
 
 Mallory Lewis on MySpace
 

1962 births
Living people
American entertainers
Daytime Emmy Award winners
American children's writers
Jewish American writers
American puppeteers
Ventriloquists
American women children's writers
Writers from New York City
21st-century American Jews
21st-century American women